"Break Away" is a song originally recorded by German singer Ivy Quainoo for her 2012 album, Ivy. Titled "Breakaway", it was covered by Canadian singer Celine Dion for her English-language studio album, Loved Me Back to Life (2013). "Breakaway" was co-written by Johan Fransson, Tim Larsson, Tobias Lundgren and Audra Mae, and produced by Play Production. The song was released by Dion as a promotional single in the United Kingdom on 5 December 2013 and in France on 22 January 2014.

Background and release
"Breakaway" and "Somebody Loves Somebody" are two songs on Dion's album Loved Me Back to Life produced by Swedish trio Play Production (Johan Fransson, Tim Larsson and Tobias Lundgren). Both songs were co-written by Fransson, Larsson, Lundgren and Audra Mae,  the great-great-niece of Judy Garland. On 2 December 2013, Dion's official website announced "Breakaway" as the second UK single. Two days earlier, it was chosen as a "Record of the Week" on BBC Radio 2. The official audio for the single was released onto Dion's Vevo channel on 3 December 2013. Two days later, "Breakaway" was added to the A-List on BBC Radio 2's Playlist in the UK. The song peaked at number thirty-eight on the UK Radio Airplay Chart in mid-December 2013 but did not enter the UK Singles Chart. On 22 January 2014, "Breakaway" was announced as the second single in France and was sent to radio stations on the same day.

Critical reception
"Breakaway" received positive reviews from music critics. Jim Farber of Daily News wrote that it "balances modern R&B with '60s lounge music in a way that would flatter Adele". USA Today editor Elysa Gardner included this song in her download list and added "Dion starts out low and sultry, then lets her big, creamy soprano rip — a pattern she follows on the "Wall of Sound"-inspired Breakaway". Gary Graff from The Oakland Press praised the vocal buildup "from the lower reaches of her register, a husker tone that sounds just as good as the more pristine approach that's her stock in trade". Andrew Hampp of Billboard also praised "Breakaway" calling it "powerful" and the song which features "arguably the grittiest, most authentically "rock" vocal we've ever heard or would expect from Dion". Deban Aderemi of Wiwibloggs commented that "Breakaway" is a beautiful piano-led track. The song's orchestration is rich, Dion's delivery is dynamic, yet she remains committed to a performance that comes from the soul.

Live performances
In early November 2013, Dion performed "Breakaway" for the UK show, Strictly Come Dancing which was broadcast during the semi-finals on 15 December 2013.

Track listing and formats
UK promotional CD single
"Breakaway" (Radio Edit) – 3:39

Charts

Credits and personnel
Recording
Vocals recorded at Studio at the Palms, Las Vegas, Nevada
Strings recorded at RMV Studios, Stockholm
Mixed at Larrabee Studios, North Hollywood, California

Personnel

Songwriting – Johan Fransson, Tim Larsson, Tobias Lundgren, Audra Mae
Production – Play Production
Vocals recording – François Lalonde
Vocals recording assistant – Mark Everton Gray
Mixing – Manny Marroquin
Mixing assistants – Chris Galland, Delbert Bowers
Programming – Tim Larsson
Piano – Johan Fransson
Electric bass – Daniel Lykkeklev
Acoustic and electric guitars – Andreas Johansson
Background vocals – Tobias Lundgren
String arrangement – Johan Fransson, Henrik Janson, Ulf Janson
Strings conductors – Henrik Janson, Ulf Janson
Orchestra – Stockholm Session Strings
Technician – Bernard Löhr

Release history

References

External links

2010s ballads
2012 songs
2013 singles
Celine Dion songs
Columbia Records singles
Ivy Quainoo songs
Pop ballads
Songs written by Audra Mae
Songs written by Johan Fransson (songwriter)
Songs written by Tim Larsson
Songs written by Tobias Lundgren